The General German Civil Service Federation (ADB) was a trade union representing civil servants in Germany.

In 1922, the German Civil Service Federation (DBB) opposed a strike by railway workers.  In protest, the federation's more left-wing affiliates left and on 8 June founded the "General German Civil Service Federation".  The new federation soon negotiated a partnership agreement with the General German Trade Union Federation, and the AfA-Bund.  It also worked closely with the Social Democratic Party of Germany (SPD), but because some SPD supporters remained part of the DBB, the SPD only recognised the new federation in 1930.

The federation was led by Albert Falkenberg and published the journal Mitteilungsblatt der Gewerkschaflichen Beamtenzentrale.  From 1925, it was affiliated to the International Federation of Civil Servants.

Membership of the federation was initially 350,000 but, due to reductions of the size of the German civil service, by 1932, it was down to 171,000.  Once a Nazi government was elected, the federation anticipated that it would be banned, and so pre-empted this by dissolving, on 6 April 1933.

As of 1928, the following unions were affiliated to the ADB, some only in respect of part of their membership:

 Central Union of Employees
 Central Union of Machinists and Stokers
 General German Postal Union
 German Musicians' Union
 General Union of German Bank Employees
 German Foremen's Union
 German Workers' Union
 National Union of German Administrative Officials
 National Union of German Municipal Officials
 Union of Administrative Officials
 Union of German Judicial and Criminal Justice Officials
 Union of German Professional Firefighters
 Union of German Teachers
 Union of Municipal and State Workers
 Union of Prison, Criminal Police, and Educational Officials
 Union of Saxon State Officials
 Union of Technical Employees and Officials
 Union of Thuringian Police Officers
 United Union of German Railway Workers

References

Organizations based in the Weimar Republic
Trade unions disestablished in 1933
Trade unions established in 1922
1922 establishments in Germany
Defunct trade unions of Germany
Civil service trade unions